Popov is a rural locality (a khutor) in Krasnooktyabrskoye Rural Settlement, Alexeyevsky District, Volgograd Oblast, Russia. The population was 93 as of 2010.

Geography 
The village is located 5 km north from Krasny Oktyabr.

References 

Rural localities in Alexeyevsky District, Volgograd Oblast